Anti-Australian sentiment (also known as Australophobia or Anti-Australianism) refers to hostile sentiment toward the nation of Australia or its people.

History 
One of the earliest references to the specific phrase "Anti-Australian sentiment" occurred in 1983 in relation to anti-independence groups in New Caledonia.

In 1948 there were anti-Australian sentiments in Singapore by their citizens due to the treatment of one of their countrywomen.

The term "anti-Australian" also predates it by decades in that by 1949, people in parts of Asia were said to have "anti-Australian feeling" over how Australia applied its White Australia policy.

In 2006 "anti-Australian sentiment" was reported in East Timor.

By country

Indonesia 
Indonesia has been alleged to have a rise in "anti-Australian sentiment" because of suggestions of Australia interfering in its internal affairs. A 2003 study on Indonesian aspirants for a diplomatic position reported that 95% of them had anti-Australian sentiment. The post-Suharto era period also saw anti-Australian sentiment in Indonesia over East Timor. In Indonesia, it is related to a generalised anti-Western sentiment.

The Australian intervention in East Timor still made the Indonesian government upset and led to it taking revenge on Australia by undermining the Australian interest in the Melanesian country.

Turkey 
After the Christchurch mosque shootings in 2019 (which were carried out by an Australian), Turkish President Recep Tayyip Erdoğan warned that if Australians and New Zealanders with anti-Muslim views try to enter Turkey, they will be "sent back home in coffins like their grandfathers", referring to the Gallipoli campaign in World War I. Many Australians and New Zealanders were highly offended by these comments and accused Erdoğan of anti-Australianism. Australian Prime Minister Scott Morrison and New Zealand Prime Minister Jacinda Ardern described these comments as "appalling" and "highly insensitive".

See also

Australophile
Foreign relations of Australia

References 

1983 neologisms
 
Australian
Foreign relations of Australia